Pneumonic (not to be confused with mnemonic) may refer to:
 Lung
 Pneumonic plague, a lung infection with Yersinia pestis
 Pneumonic device
 Someone with Pneumonia